Mo Il-hwan (born 18 May 1999) is a South Korean sprinter who specializes in the 400 metres.

He competed in the heats at the 2016 World U20 Championships and reached the semi-final at the 2017 Asian Championships, the 2018 Asian Games and the 2019 Asian Championships.

In the 4 × 400 metres relay he finished sixth at the 2017 Asian Championships. He was also a heat runner in the 4 × 100 at the 2018 Asian Games.

His personal best time is 46.17 seconds, achieved at the 2019 Asian Championships in Doha.

References

1999 births
Living people
South Korean male sprinters
Athletes (track and field) at the 2018 Asian Games
Asian Games competitors for South Korea
Universiade medalists in athletics (track and field)
Universiade bronze medalists for South Korea
21st-century South Korean people